Birmingham Brummies are a British speedway team founded in 1928. They were inaugural members of the Southern League in 1929. The team have twice finished runner-up in the highest tier of British speedway, during the 1952 Speedway National League and 2013 Elite League speedway season. After four years in the National League, in 2019 they moved up to the second tier of British speedway in the SGB Championship.

History

1928–1986
Birmingham had two teams in the Southern League of the inaugural season of British speedway in 1929. One was based at the old Perry Barr stadium) and the other was based at Hall Green Stadium. The Hall Green team, known during their time as Birmingham Bulldogs, closed in 1938. Speedway continued at Perry Barr Stadium until 1953.
The Brummies reopened in 1971 at Perry Barr before closing at the end of 1983. The Brummies then opened at the Wheels Project at Bordesley Green in 1985 racing for two seasons in the National League before closing in 1986. Although Birmingham did win trophies during their initial spell in Speedway these achievements were often dwarfed by the success of fellow West Midlands Speedway teams, the Wolverhampton Wolves, Coventry Bees and Cradley Heathens.

2006-Present
After 20 years away from the sport Birmingham were reformed in 2006 and then accepted into the Premier League in 2007. The first meeting of the new era, the Alan Hunt Memorial, took place on 21 March 2007. In a successful first season the team finished in second place in the league table, and runner-up in both the Premier Trophy and the Young Shield, despite having only two members of their own team actually fit to ride. During the majority of their time in the Premier League they were captained by Australian Jason Lyons who went on to become extremely popular at the club and is now a member of the club's Hall of Fame. The club when re founded was sponsored by Richard Meredith of Mercom Water Products.

Birmingham were accepted into the Elite League for 2011 and finished their first season in ninth place out of ten. Ahead of their second season in the top flight they retained the services of the previous season's star performers Danny King and Ben Barker as well as adding Speedway Grand Prix star Bjarne Pedersen. Although Pedersen's time at Birmingham was an unhappy one the team made a big improvement on their first season in the Elite League, finishing in 3rd place and achieving a spot in the play-offs. The 2013 season was filled with success, with the Brummies finishing in 1st place in the Elite League and achieving a place in the Elite League Grand Final. They found themselves outclassed in the final, losing out on aggregate 104-79 to the Poole Pirates, who were inspired by Greg Hancock.

Despite the success of the 2013 season there were regular reports of turmoil behind the scenes at the club, and at the end of the season team manager Phil Morris walked away from the club. The off season was a difficult time for the club, with captain Danny King handing in a transfer request, although he was later convinced to stay. Once the season began the troubles only intensified, and on 14 July 2014 it was announced that the club would cease to operate. The team was taken over later that year by Tony Mole and entered into the National League for 2015. Under the stewardship of Mole and Drury The Brummies would crown a superb season back on track by winning the National League title. The Brummies defended their National League title in 2016, beating Eastbourne in a two leg play off, the play off system having been controversially introduced for this season. they would also win the National Trophy to crown a superb double.

Ahead of the 2017 season owner Tony Mole announced that he will be walking away from the sport after the 2017 season, after 31 years promoting in the sport. The Birmingham Brummies had their future secured when they were bought by David and Peter Mason toward the end of the 2017 season.

Perry Barr Stadium

Perry Barr Stadium (also known as Perry Barr Greyhound Stadium) is the home track of the Birmingham Brummies, located on Aldridge Road in Perry Barr, Birmingham. Having been reformed in 2006 Birmingham returned to the stadium, which at this time is now primarily being used for greyhound racing.

Riders previous seasons

2007 team

 

 (Number 8)

Also rode

2008 team

 

Also rode

2009 team

 

Also rode

2010 team

 

Also rode

2011 team

 

Also rode

2012 team

 

Also rode

2013 team

2014 team

 

Also rode

2015 team

Also rode

2016 team

2017 team

Also rode

2018 team

2019 team

2021 team

2022 team

 (C)

Also Rode

Season summary

+5th place at time of cut off

Club honours
Division 2 Anniversary Cup Winners - 1948
Division 2 National Trophy Winners - 1948
Midland Cup - 1953, 1954, 1955
British League Division 2 Champions - 1974
British League Division 2 Knock-Out Cup - 1974
National League Champions - 1975
Midland Shield - 2007
Premier League Pairs - 2009
Premier League Fours - 2010
National League Fours - 2015
National League Champions - 2015, 2016
National Trophy Winners - 2016

Notable riders

References

External links

Brummies Forum
Brummiers Fans

Speedway Elite League teams
SGB Championship teams
Sport in Birmingham, West Midlands
Perry Barr